Alexander Menshikov may refer to:

 Alexander Danilovich Menshikov (1673–1729), Russian statesman
 Alexander Sergeyevich Menshikov (1787–1869), Finnish-Russian nobleman
 Alexander Alexandrovich Menshikov (1714–1764), officer in the Russian army